The Roman Catholic Diocese of Ningyuan/Xichang  is a diocese located in the city of Xichang in the Ecclesiastical province of Chongqing in China.

History
 August 12, 1910: Established as Apostolic Vicariate of Jianchang (Kien-tchang; 建昌) from the Apostolic Vicariate of Southern Szechwan 南四川
 December 3, 1924: Renamed as Apostolic Vicariate of Ningyuanfu (Lin-yuen-fou; 甯遠府)
 April 11, 1946: Promoted as Diocese of Ningyuan (甯遠)

Leadership
 Bishops of Ningyuan 甯遠 (Roman rite)
 Bishop John Lei Jia-pei (December 2, 2016 – present)
 Bishop Stanislas-Gabriel-Henri Baudry, M.E.P. (April 11, 1946 – August 6, 1954)
 Vicars Apostolic of Ningyuanfu 甯遠府 (Roman Rite)
 Bishop Stanislas-Gabriel-Henri Baudry, M.E.P. (March 18, 1927 – April 11, 1946)
 Bishop Joseph-Fructueux Bourgain, M.E.P. (March 31, 1918 – September 30, 1925)
 Vicars Apostolic of Jianchang 建昌 (Roman Rite)
 Bishop Jean-Baptiste-Marie Budes de Guébriant, M.E.P. (later Archbishop) (August 12, 1910 – April 28, 1916)

Gallery

See also
 Anglican Diocese of Szechwan
 Catholic Church in Sichuan

References
 GCatholic.org
 Catholic Hierarchy

Ningyuan
Christian organizations established in 1910
Roman Catholic dioceses and prelatures established in the 20th century